The Hsiung Feng IIE (HF-2E) is a surface-to-surface cruise missile system developed by the National Chung-Shan Institute of Science and Technology (NCSIST) in Taiwan.

Development
According to Taiwan Defense Review (TDR), the HF-2E land attack cruise missile is not a derivative of the Hsiung Feng 2 HF-2 anti-ship missile as it is often incorrectly reported. The use of the "HF-2E" designation is the primary cause of this confusion and was intentional misinformation done to divert attention away from the true nature of the project, which is that of a long range offensive cruise missile. The HF-2E is actually a completely different design and is said to serve a similar function in Taiwan's military as the US Navy Tomahawk (RGM-109) cruise missile. Its launch weight is reported to be in the  range, including its solid rocket booster. It is essentially a tactical land attack cruise missile designed for use against military target sets, particularly air-defense fire units and command-and-control facilities, and its relatively small warhead size and the rather limited number of missiles planned for procurement clearly suggest that this is not a "first strike" weapon.

The project was first announced in 2001. Following several test firings in 2004 and early 2005 at the Jiu Peng Missile Range in southeastern Taiwan, the baseline HF-2E (Block I) completed its operational evaluation (OPEVAL) in 2005, the missile flying a low-altitude circuit off Taiwan's southeastern coastline between Pingtung and Lanyu Island. An improved HF-2E missile was reportedly tested by CSIST at Jui Peng Missile Range on 2 February 2007. In 2017 the missiles received an extensive upgrade to increase their effectiveness against naval targets.

Description 
The baseline HF-2E Block I land attack cruise missile (LACM) is said to be powered by an indigenously-developed Taiwanese turbofan engine believed to be rated in the  thrust range and developed by CSIST partially based on technology and experience from the Microturbo 078 turbojet engine used on Hsiung Feng 2 (HF-2) anti-ship cruise missiles. When equipped with a standard unitary high-explosive -class warhead, it is said to have a maximum range of 700 km. Other types of warhead are said to be in development, such as cluster submunitions and a hard target penetrator warhead. TDR also reported that through modification of the existing engine and combined with the redesign and reduction of the missile's control and electronic systems, CSIST was able to free up enough internal space/weight in the missile to allow it to carry additional fuel and extend its range to over 2,000 km, although a Defense News report claimed the other version was only an 800 km range missile.

The HF-2E Block I missile uses inertial guidance with global positioning system (GPS) and TERCOM updates. For terminal guidance, it uses infrared homing (Imaging infrared) with an autonomous digital target recognition system. The IIR terminal seeker is used for target acquisition and to positively identify an optimal aim point. The target image is then compared against digitized files in the memory of the on-board guidance computer (DSMAC terminal guidance). The HF-2E block I missile's cruising speed is high subsonic, typically in the  range. On its final approach to its target, the missile would climb up to avoid any physical barriers and to allow its IIR seeker to acquire the target and identify an optimal aim point before plunging down onto the designated impact point. The report in Taiwan Defense Review, credited the HF-2E block I missile with a pre-terminal accuracy of around 15 m.

Production and fielding  
The low-rate production of the Block I missile was to have started in July 2005 and using funds originally allocated for its R&D, at least five missiles were built. The unit cost per missile was estimated to be at US$3.08 million (2003 US$ dollar value). Another report made in 2006 claimed that three batteries comprising twenty-four mobile launchers and forty-eight missiles were in the final stages of testing and may be fielded within two years. The HF-2E beganlow volume production in the Project ChiChun (戟隼, jǐ zhǔn, lance hawk). A Taipei Times news report claimed that President Ma Ying Jeou ordered the production of 500 to 1000 HF-2E missiles in 2008. It was approved and cleared to enter full volume/serial production in 2011. It supposedly can deliver a  unitary warhead . The Associated Press has reported a range of 1,500 km.

The HF-2E missile is primarily deployed operationally in ground-mobile launchers. The launcher vehicle carries the missiles in protective aluminum box launchers, with wings and control fins retracted, conceptually similar to the trailer-mounted mobile launchers for Tien Kung Sky Bow series surface-to-air missiles and HF-2 coastal defense missiles. The launchers are normally based in hardened shelters at military installations, with deployment to remote, pre-surveyed launch sites during alert situations. The SCMP has reported that the HF-IIE is closely watched by the PLA's Rocket Force.

In 2022 annual combined production of the HF-2E and Hsiung Sheng was 81 units, the two missiles share a production line.

Hsiung Sheng 
The improved variant has been designated the Hsiung Sheng. It is designed to be able to strike critical targets in distant Chinese cities like Wuhan and Qingdao.

In January 2021 the Air Force took delivery of the first batch of improved HF-2E missiles. The range is reported to be in excess of 1,200 km however the number of missiles deployed is confidential. The Hsiung Sheng carries either a unitary or fragmentation warhead. The unitary high explosive warhead is designed to target bunkers and command centers while the fragmentation warhead is designed to target airfields.

General characteristics
 Primary Function: Land attack cruise missile
 Power Plant: Solid propellant rocket booster, turbojet or turbofan engine for sustained cruise flight
 Range: Alternately reported to be 600 km, 1,500 km, and 2,000 km.
 Top Speed: 
 Guidance: INS and commercial GPS with in-flight waypoints and corrected by digital maps/terrain matching and forward-looking imaging infrared (IIR) seeker with autonomous target recognition for terminal guidance
 Launch Weight:  including solid rocket booster
 Precision: Within 10 m
 Warhead: 
 Date deployed: Unknown

See also
Hsiung Feng I
Hsiung Feng III
Yun Feng

References

External links
UDN article on final development stages
StrategyPage article on deployment

Cruise missiles of the Republic of China
Cruise missiles
Weapons and ammunition introduced in 2011